Inuk Silis Høegh (born 1972 in Qaqortoq, Greenland, Kingdom of Denmark) is a Greenlandic artist and filmmaker. The son of artist Aka Høegh and photographer and film artist Ivars Silis, he grew up in an artistic environment, and his sister is Bolatta Silis Høegh, also an artist.

Background and education
Høegh received the Niels Wessel Bagges Grant in 2005, completing a Master of Fine Arts (MFA) from The Royal Danish Academy of Fine Arts (2010) and a Master of Arts in Film and TV Production from the University of Bristol (1997).

Career

Filmmaking
Høegh's 2002 documentary "Eskimo Weekend" followed a Greenlandic rock band over a weekend, and has been credited with challenging stereotypes about Inuit.  
In 2014 Høegh released the documentary Sumé: Sound of a Revolution about the groundbreaking Greenlandic rock band Sumé. The movie was the first ever Greenlandic selection shown at the Berlinale festival, and was very well received.

Visual art
In 2013 Høegh's art installation Iluliaq, a monumental sculpture of an iceberg, was installed in the Great Hall of the National Gallery of Canada, in Ottawa, as part of the exhibition Sakahàn: International Indigenous Art. The work provided a commentary on climate change, as it appeared gradually to "melt" as the windows of the Great Hall were replaced over the duration of the installation.
His artwork has been featured in exhibitions in countries including Greenland, Denmark, France, Iceland, Finland, Latvia and Germany, and his film work has been shown internationally.

Filmography
 Godnat - Sinilluarit (short film, 1999)
 På Fremmed Is (documentary, 2000)
 Eskimo Weekend (short film, 2001)
 Red Lights and Time for Time (music videos, 2003–2004)
 Sooq Akersuuttugut / Why We Fight (art video, 2004)
 Tarrarsornerit / Spejlinger (documentary, 2007)
 Sumé: The Sound of a Revolution (documentary, 2014)
 The Green Land

References

External links
 https://www.thesoundofarevolution.com/
 https://www.dfi.dk/viden-om-film/filmdatabasen/person/inuk-silis-hoegh

1972 births
Living people
Greenlandic artists
Greenlandic Inuit people
People from Qaqortoq